Aneesh Ravi is an Indian television and theatre actor and television anchor who is active in the Malayalam television industry. He acted in Tamil TV serials such as Megala (2007–2010) and Shanthi Nilayam (2011–2012). He won the Kerala State Television Award for Best Actor for the serial Sree Narayana Guru (2005), and gained fame from comedy serials Karyam Nissaram (2012–2017) and Aliyan VS Aliyan (2018–2019) and Aliyans (2019-Still Airing).

Personal life 
Ravi was born to Raveendran and Ambika in Chirayinkeezhu, Kerala. He holds a post-graduate degree in Malayalam literature and diploma in Media cum Journalism. During his school and college days, Ravi performed in amateur plays and did mimicry. He won first prize in mimicry at the Kerala University Youth Festival in 1994. He is married to Jayalakshmi in 2003 and has two sons.

Career 

His popular serials include Snehatheeram, Minnukettu, Meghala, Sthree, Sree Narayana Guru, Oridathoridathu, and Karyam Nissaram. Ravi started his career as a theatre artist in Raghu's Natakayogam, one among the oldest theatre troupes in Thiruvananthapuram. He later worked in professional troupes like Padmasree, Souparnika and Sanghachetana. Some of his popular plays include Ravanaprabhu, Overbridge, and Soothaputhran.

Television career 
Ravi began acting on television with the serial Snehatheeram. He later appeared in soap operas like Mohanam, Sthree, Minnukettu, Alippazham, and Manasariyathe. His popular serials in Tamil include Meghala and thespian K. Balachander's Santhinilayam. Ravi won a State Award in 2005 for the titular role in the serial Sree Narayana Guru. He is also a part of the comedy-drama series Karyam Nissaram.

Apart from interviewing celebrities and being a judge for various reality shows, Aneesh has anchored shows such as Adipoli Swad, Thillana Thillana, City Girls, and Oru Nunakatha. He also hosts shows like Campus Colours, Cucumber City and Erivum Puliyum. Tharolsavam and Sundari Neeyum Sundaran Njanum allowed him to exhibit his skills in miming, skits, and music. Ravi worked as a producer for the 2016 serial Moonu Pennungal under Varadayini creations.

Telefilms 
12 Vayassu (as Thulasi's Mother) – won, Adoor Bhasi cultural forum Cinema-Television awards 2016-Best telefilm

Television

TV serials

Television shows

Filmography

Awards and nominations

References

External links 

 
 Official Website

Living people
Male actors in Malayalam television
Indian male television actors
1994 births
Male actors from Thiruvananthapuram
21st-century Indian male actors
20th-century Indian male actors